Obory  is a village in the administrative district of Gmina Gizałki, within Pleszew County, Greater Poland Voivodeship, in west-central Poland.

The village has a population of 390.

References

Obory